Crown Imperial can be:

 Chrysler Crown Imperial, a model of Chrysler Imperial automobile
 Crown Imperial, a model of Imperial automobile
 Crown Imperial (march), a musical composition by Sir William Walton
 Fritillaria imperialis (Kaiser's Crown), a plant